The 2022 Salford Red Devils season is the 14th consecutive season in the Super League and their 11th season at the AJ Bell Stadium. Salford were coached by Paul Rowley and they competed in both Super League XXVII and the 2022 Challenge Cup.

2022 Super League table

2022 play-offs

2022 squad

External links
Rugby League Project

Super League website

Salford Red Devils seasons
2022 in English rugby league
Super League XXVII by club